Abdellah Benmenni (born 19 August 1986) is an Algerian handball goalkeeper for Mouloudia Club d'Alger GS Pétroliers.

He currently plays for the Algerian national team, and has represented Algeria in several international championships, including the 2013 World Championships in Spain, the 2015 World Men's Handball Championship in Qatar and the 2021 IHF World Men's Handball Championship in Cairo.

References

1986 births
Living people
Algerian male handball players
Competitors at the 2018 Mediterranean Games
Place of birth missing (living people)
Mediterranean Games competitors for Algeria
21st-century Algerian people
20th-century Algerian people